Charles Younger (born August 11, 1963) is an American politician who has served in the Mississippi State Senate from the 17th district since 2014.

References

1963 births
Living people
Republican Party Mississippi state senators
21st-century American politicians